Persona Q2: New Cinema Labyrinth is a dungeon crawler role-playing video game developed and published by Atlus for the Nintendo 3DS. It is a spin-off of the Persona series, itself part of the larger Megami Tensei franchise, and a sequel to Persona Q: Shadow of the Labyrinth. It was released in Japan in November 2018 and worldwide in June 2019.

Plot
The story of the game focuses on the cast from Persona 3, Persona 4, and Persona 5. During a trip to Mementos, Joker and the rest of the Phantom Thieves of Hearts find themselves in a film, which is connected to a theater that is locked from the inside. With Makoto and Haru kidnapped, the Phantom Thieves meet Nagi and Hikari in the theater, who are also locked in with them, as well as Doe, a Shadow in the projection room. As the Phantom Thieves venture through movies, they meet allies along the way: the Persona 3 female protagonist in Kamoshidaman; the Investigation Team in Junessic Land; and SEES in A.I.G.I.S, all of them who have fallen into the movie world during a routine trip to the TV World and Tartarus.

Each of the films the group travels through have morals surrounding discarding individuality and personality and conforming to others' expectations. Whilst traveling, the group changes the films' endings, giving them happy endings as Hikari and Nagi watch from the theater. Upon returning, Doe presents them with a key that unlocks each of the 4 locks on the door.

Upon unlocking the 3rd lock, Hikari is presumably kidnapped by Doe, who escapes into the 4th film, a musical with a blacked-out title. While exploring the film, the group discovers Hikari's memories; throughout her life, she repeatedly suffered traumatic experiences that made her believe individuality is worthless, culminating in extreme depression and causing her to confine herself in her room as a result. Her father accidentally triggered her with a turn of phrase used against her by her tormentors, causing her to completely break down. Doe is revealed to be a representation of Hikari's father, and the two share a hug after a battle with a rampaging Doe. Doe then transforms into the final key, and the film's title is revealed to be "Hikari".

With all the locks unlocked, the group exits the cinema, only to discover a world of film before them. Nagi then reveals her true nature as Enlil, an entity that draws depressed people into her world and has them re-watch their memories, trapping them there with their own lack of desire to escape. Using Hikari's edited films, the group purify the Theater District, and send a calling card to Enlil. After a climactic battle with Hikari's help, the group defeats Enlil and make her realize humanity's possibilities.

The people in her domain are freed, yet their memories are wiped and they have no recollection of the events. Before leaving, the groups bid their farewells and leave, with Hikari tearfully bidding them all goodbye. Hikari wakes up in reality, and she makes up with her father while expressing her desire to create her film. The P3 and P4 casts wake up and watch their respective films, including the alternate version of the P3 cast. The P5 cast wakes up and later receive an invitation to a film festival which they attend. As they attend, Hikari steps out and announces her new film, "New Cinema Labyrinth".

Development and release
Persona Q director Daisuke Kanada had originally envisioned the game as the foundation for a larger spin-off series rather than a standalone project. Following the release and positive reception of Persona 5, Atlus decided to create a Persona Q sequel featuring the cast of Persona 5. Full development for Persona Q2 began following the completion of Persona 5 in 2016, with Kanada returning as producer; the director was Yuta Aihara. Based on feedback from Persona Q, the team refined the gameplay mechanics and balanced the difficulty for its sequel. They also brought in both new original characters and the Persona 5 cast. Due to fan demand, the female protagonist from Persona 3 Portable was also included as a character. To keep the story focused, there was no option of choosing which group of protagonists to choose from. Instead the story focused primarily on the Persona 5 protagonists. As part of his original pitch, the original game's horror elements were toned down or removed, and the overall gameplay was simplified for new players. Aihara included the story-based "Special Screenings" elements based on his liking of the "Strolls" from Persona Q.

Composer Atsushi Kitajoh, composer for Persona Q and other Persona games, returned to create new tracks for Persona Q2. His key words for the music were "Retro", "Pop", and "Kitsch". The vocals were provided by Yumi Kawamura (Persona 3), Mayumi Fujita (Persona 3 Portable), Shihoko Hirata (Persona 4) and Lyn (Persona 5). Rapper Lotus Juice, who contributed to the series frequently since Persona 3, was also featured in several tracks. The opening theme "Road Less Taken" was a quartet performance by Kawamura, Hirata, Lyn and Lotus Juice.

Persona Q2 was first announced in August 2017 alongside fellow spin-off titles Persona 5: Dancing in Starlight and Persona 3: Dancing in Moonlight. Its official reveal came in August the following year, where it was released in Japan on November 29, 2018. The game was released in North America and Europe on June 4, 2019, along with a "Showtime Premium Edition" for the former. This was one of the last physical 3DS games released in North America, and is the final completely original physical game released for the Nintendo 3DS in North America. Unlike previously localized Persona games, the game does not feature an English dub.

Reception

Accolades
The game was nominated for "Game, Franchise Role Playing" at the NAVGTR Awards.

Notes

References

External links

2018 video games
Deep Silver games
Nintendo 3DS eShop games
Nintendo 3DS games
Nintendo 3DS-only games
First-person party-based dungeon crawler video games
Nintendo Network games
Persona (series)
Persona 5
Crossover role-playing video games
Video game sequels
Video games developed in Japan
Atlus games